Allgemeine Anzeigen GmbH, abbreviated Ala was a central advertising agency of the Nazi Party, created in 1926 from "Ausland GmbH" (Foreign Lands, Ltd.).  It was part of the Alfred Hugenberg concern, taken over by the Eher Press in 1934 in order to improve the advertising position of the National Socialist Gau presses.

Bibliography
Christian Zentner, Friedemann Bedürftig (1991). The Encyclopedia of the Third Reich.  Macmillan, New York. 

Nazi Party organizations
Organizations established in 1926
1926 establishments in Germany